Eagle Lake (New York) may refer to the following lakes:

 Eagle Lake (Essex County, New York)
 Eagle Lake (Hamilton County, New York)
 Eagle Lake (Orange County, New York)

See also
 Eagle Lake, New York